The scaly chatterer (Argya aylmeri) is a species of bird in the family Leiothrichidae. It is also known as the bare-eyed babbler. It is found in Ethiopia, Kenya, Somalia, and Tanzania. Its natural habitat is subtropical or tropical dry shrubland.

This species was formerly placed in the genus Turdoides but following the publication of a comprehensive molecular phylogenetic study in 2018, it was moved to the resurrected genus Argya.

References

External links

 
 
 
 
 

scaly chatterer
Birds of East Africa
Birds of the Horn of Africa
scaly chatterer
Taxonomy articles created by Polbot